Homoderus mellyi is a species of stag beetle in the family Lucanidae.

References

External links 
 http://www.goliathus.com/en/en-homoderus-mellyi.html

Lucaninae
Beetles described in 1862